Dubai Industrial City is the dedicated industrial park in Dubai, UAE, founded in 2004, covering an area of 560 million Sq ft.

Overview
The Industrial City includes food and beverage zones, base-metal and transportation zones, warehouses and an extensive conservation area. These areas are complemented with logistics, educational and mixed use developments. It is located near Al Maktoum Airport and Jebel Ali International Airport along Emirates Road. The city is expected to accommodate around 500,000 people when it is completed by 2015.

Dubai Industrial City encompasses six zones:

 Zone 1: Food and Beverage
 Zone 2: Transport Equipment and Parts
 Zone 3: Machinery and Equipment
 Zone 4: Mineral Products 
 Zone 5: Base Metal
 Zone 6: Chemicals

International Humanitarian City is located to the northeast.

Developments
In March 2009, the construction of Dubai industrial city's warehouses was completed, with the whole project then aimed for completion in 2015.

See also
 Dubai TechnoPark
 International Humanitarian City

References

External links

UAEpropertytrends.com
Ameinfo.com
Dubaiholding.com
cansultmaunsell.com

2004 establishments in the United Arab Emirates
Buildings and structures in Dubai
Economy of Dubai
Geography of Dubai
Free-trade zones of the United Arab Emirates
Industrial parks in the United Arab Emirates